Emeka Sibeudu  (born November 6, 1958 in Umunze, Nigeria) is a Nigerian politician. He is the former Deputy governor of Anambra State.

References 

1958 births
Living people
Nigerian Roman Catholics
Igbo people
Igbo politicians
People from Umunze
Anambra State politicians